José Feliciano Peñarrieta Flores (born 18 November 1988) is a Bolivian footballer who plays as a goalkeeper for Oriente Petrolero.

Peñarrieta has appeared for the Bolivia national football team and was part of the squad for the 2015 Copa América.

References

External links
 

1988 births
Living people
People from Gran Chaco Province
Association football goalkeepers
Bolivian footballers
La Paz F.C. players
Club San José players
The Strongest players
Oriente Petrolero players
2015 Copa América players